Ann Bryson (born 1964) is a British actress who is best known for featuring in the television series Days Like These and Space Vets, and Philadelphia cream cheese adverts with Sara Crowe, with whom she also formed the comedy duo Flaming Hamsters. Both actresses also appeared together as bank secretaries in the 1995 film The Steal.

References

External links

1964 births
English film actresses
English television actresses
Living people